The Palmyra massacre is an incident that took place in Palmyra, Missouri on October 18, 1862, during the American Civil War, when ten Confederate prisoners of war were executed in reprisal for the abduction of a local Union supporter, Andrew Alsman. The officer who ordered the execution, Colonel John McNeil, was later known as the "Butcher of Palmyra". He left the army in 1865, after receiving the customary promotion to brevet rank of Major General of Volunteers in recognition of his faithful service to the Union.

Disappearance of Alsman
Andrew Alsman was a carpenter, sixty years old, and a Union patriot in a largely pro-Confederate area. A Union source describes him as a highly respected and conscientious man who did his duty by leading Union forces to arrest local Confederate sympathizers.

He was taken prisoner by Colonel Porter's forces when Porter raided Palmyra on 12 September 1862. After several skirmishes, Porter decided that Alsman was a liability and set him free. Alsman was hesitant to leave the camp as there were several men who had family members that Alsman had informed on, so Porter allowed him to choose a detail that would see him safely to the city limits of Palmyra or to the nearest Union lines.

Alsman departed camp and was never seen again. Speculation is that he was taken into the woods in northern Marion County or southern Lewis County and shot.

On October 8, Provost Marshal William R. Strachan, a former deputy U. S. Marshal in Missouri, acting for Colonel McNeil, published a notice in the local Union newspaper, the Palmyra Courier (see below) to Confederate Colonel Joseph C. Porter. McNeil threatened that unless Alsman was returned within ten days, ten of Porter's men held as prisoners in Palmyra and Hannibal would be executed.

Porter may never even have seen the notice, and most writers agree that Alsman had already been the victim of personal enemies among Porter's men. The Confederate colonel was therefore powerless to return him. Nevertheless, the presumed murder of Alsman was viewed as part of a pattern of extralegal behavior regarded by Porter's enemies as typical of his command, tolerated if not encouraged by the Rebel leader.

Victims
On the evening of 17 October ten prisoners were selected, five from the jail in Hannibal, Missouri, five from the jail in Palmyra.  None of them had any connection with the disappearance of Alsman; Willis Baker was in the Palmyra jail because his sons were said to be riding with Colonel Porter. He was also reported to have killed a Union neighbor in the previous year. All ten were executed on 18 October by a firing squad of thirty soldiers from the Second Missouri State Militia.

Aftermath
After the massacre, it has been claimed that Strachan spared the life of one of the intended victims (William Thomas Humphrey of Lewis County) in exchange for $500 paid by Humphrey's wife. Strachan is also said to have violated the chastity of Mrs. Humphrey, whether as part of the bargain or not. In 1864 Strachan was tried for the rape of Mrs. Humphrey and other offenses, including misuse of funds. Found innocent of rape but guilty of embezzlement, he was sentenced to prison and was released by General William Starke Rosecrans on the grounds of persecution and an unfair trial, even though his accuser was another Union officer.

Alsman's skull
According to James J. Fisher's column in the Kansas City Star (July 29, 1994) Andrew Alsman was observed alive September 16, 1862, in the company of two Confederate guerillas, near Troublesome Creek (in the vicinity of Steffenville, MO). In 1877, a farmer walking the creek found and later gave away a skull he thought to be Alsman's. The skull came into the possession of a Newark, MO pharmacist, who put it on display, where it attracted much attention. A man named Edward Wilson purchased it in 1890 and had it placed in a walnut chest lined with velvet. Eventually, he returned the skull to one of Alsman's daughters, living in Palmyra, who supposedly identified it and arranged for burial. Paul Davis, a journalist working for the Hannibal Courier-Post, recalls being shown a box matching this description and containing a skull said to be Alsman's by a Ralls County resident in the 1990s.

The Western Historical Manuscripts Collection at The University of Missouri-Columbia's Ellis Library has an "Account of finding skull believed to be that of Andrew Alsman.

Legacy 
The Palmyra Confederate Monument Association erected a granite monument in Palmyra on February 25, 1907. The victims listed were Capt. Thomas A. Siednor, Willis T. Baker, Thomas Humston, Morgan Bixler, John Y. McPheeters, Hiram T. Smith (chosen as a substitute for William Thomas Humphrey), Herbert Hudson, John M. Wade, Francis M. Lear and Eleazer Lake. The monument stands outside the Palmyra courthouse. The actual site of the massacre at the old fairgrounds is currently a farm field just east of Palmyra.

The Marion County Jail and Jailor's House was added to the National Register of Historic Places in 2002.

References

Further reading
Harper's Weekly, January 1864
Contemporary background documents from  The Palmyra Massacre
Mudd, Joseph A. With Porter in Northeast Missouri. National Publishing Company, 1909
Sallee, Scott E. "Porter's Campaign in Northeast Missouri, 1862, Including the Palmyra Massacre." Blue & Gray 17 (February 2000): 6-12,14-16,18,20,44-51. Illus. Sidebars: "Joseph A. Mudd - With Porter in No. Missouri," p. 10; "Their Last Hours - An Account of Elder Jacob Creath, Jr.," p. 45; "Last Letters By Several of the Palmyra Condemned," pp. 46–47; "Whatever Happened to Andrew Alsman?," p. 49.

External links
The Palmyra Massacre Marker
The Palmyra Massacre, The Civil War in Missouri
Palmyra Massacre Collection, Missouri Secretary of State
Photograph of Marion County Civil War Monument, Palmyra, Missouri

Massacres of the American Civil War
Military operations of the American Civil War in Missouri
1862 in Missouri
Union war crimes
People executed by the United States by firing squad
October 1862 events